Grzegorz Gawlik (born 6 May 1980) is a Polish traveler, mountaineer, volcanoes explorer, journalist, photographer and lawyer.

Life and career
He has traveled several hundred journeys to about 100 countries on six continents.

Author of the 100 VOLCANOES PROJECT. He has been working on the project since 2006. In 2016 the project was halfway through. Project assumptions. At least half the volcanoes must be active. Volcanoes are precisely tailored, difficult to access and very interesting in terms of exploratory and scientific. Often wild, most active, the highest.

Gawlik has explored volcanoes of heights of 0 – 6896 m, in many countries, on different continents and in different climates. Among other things, he discovered the highest lakes in the world on the Ojos del Salado volcano and found that the highest active volcano in the world is Llullaillaco.

In addition, he explored more than 100 other volcanic sites such as geyser fields, geothermal fields, volcanic caves, volcanic deserts, volcanic plateaus, volcanic craters and cones, volcanic rock formations, lava fields.
He climbed to about 100 peaks 4-, 5-, 6- and 7-thousand meters in the Himalayas, Andes, Pamir, Caucasus, Cordillera, High Atlas, Tanzania, Borneo and hundreds of lower peaks.

During the expeditions, Gawlik explored numerous glaciers and polar regions. Visited several hundred of the most valuable monuments for world heritage. He traveled the largest deserts and plateaus, tropical forests, lakes, rivers, dozens of seas. Visited several hundred islands, caves and the largest cities in the world. Traveled the most famous roads and railway lines.

He completed law studies at the Silesian University in Katowice and won a plebiscite: The Graduate with Passion in 2014. He is a laureate of travel and journalism prizes.

Gawlik cooperates with television channels, radio stations, internet portals, magazines and newspapers.

References

1980 births
Polish travel writers
Living people
Travelers
Polish mountain climbers